Bâsca may refer to several rivers and settlements in Romania:
 Bâsca (also Bâsca Roziliei), a tributary of the river Buzău
 Bâsca Mică, a tributary of the river Bâsca
 Bâsca Mare, the upper course of the river Bâsca
 Bâsca Chiojdului, a tributary of the river Buzău
 Bâsca Chiojdului, a village in the commune Chiojdu